Nilaj is a village in the Karmala taluka of Solapur district in Maharashtra state, India.

Demographics
Covering  and comprising 118 households at the time of the 2011 census of India, Nilaj had a population of 647. There were 336 males and 311 females, with 74 people being aged six or younger.

References

Villages in Karmala taluka